Titas Milašius (born 12 December 2000) is a Lithuanian professional footballer who plays as a midfielder for Polish club Podbeskidzie Bielsko-Biała and the Lithuania national team.

Youth career
At the age of 11, he traveled to Warsaw and was successful in the recruitment of young players at the Escola Varsovia academy of Barcelona. After a few years, he returned to Lithuania for a short while to represent Vilniaus Futbolo Mokykla and Nacionalinę futbolo akademiją (NFA), but later returned to Poland to join Escola Varsovia again.

Career

Wisła Płock
After training with Wisła Płock for over a month in the winter 2019, the club confirmed on 25 February 2019, that Milašius would join Wisła Płock from their partner club FCB Escola Varsovia for the upcoming season, signing a pre-contract until the summer 2022. On 11 February 2020 Wisła announced, that Milašius had been loaned out to Świt Nowy Dwór Mazowiecki in the Polish third league for the rest of the season. He returned to Wisła in June 2020, but was loaned out again in January 2021, this time to Skra Częstochowa for the rest of the season.

References

External links

 wisla-plock.pl
 
 lietuvosfutbolas.lt
 

2000 births
Footballers from Vilnius
Living people
Lithuanian footballers
Lithuania international footballers
Lithuania youth international footballers
Lithuania under-21 international footballers
Association football midfielders
Wisła Płock players
Świt Nowy Dwór Mazowiecki players
Skra Częstochowa players
Podbeskidzie Bielsko-Biała players
Ekstraklasa players
I liga players
II liga players
III liga players
Lithuanian expatriate footballers
Lithuanian expatriate sportspeople in Poland
Expatriate footballers in Poland